The 1992 Polish Speedway season was the 1992 season of motorcycle speedway in Poland.

Individual

Polish Individual Speedway Championship
The 1992 Individual Speedway Polish Championship final was held on 6 September at Zielona Góra. Tomasz Gollob won the Polish Championship for the first time.

Golden Helmet
The 1992 Golden Golden Helmet organised by the Polish Motor Union (PZM) was the 1992 event for the league's leading riders. The final was held at Wrocław on the 15 October. Tomasz Gollob won the Golden Helmet for the first time and therefore completing the Polish Championship and Golden Helmet double.

Junior Championship
 winner - Tomasz Gollob

Silver Helmet
 winner - Tomasz Gollob

Bronze Helmet
 winner - Maciej Bargiel

Pairs

Polish Pairs Speedway Championship
The 1992 Polish Pairs Speedway Championship was the 19 edition of the Polish Pairs Speedway Championship. The final was held on 1992 May at Gorzów Wielkopolski.

Team

Team Speedway Polish Championship
The 1992 Team Speedway Polish Championship was the 1992 edition of the Team Polish Championship. Polonia Bydgoszcz won the gold medal.

First Division

Second Division

References

Poland Individual
Poland Team
Speedway
1992 in Polish speedway